These are the international rankings of Venezuela.

Corruption

Venezuela was ranked the 7th most corrupt country in the world according to the Corruption Perceptions Index.

Crime

List of countries by homicide rate ranked 2nd highest homicide rate in the world.

Economy

World Bank List of countries by GDP (nominal) ranked 30th biggest economy in the world (this citation should be reviewed, Venezuela has a blank entry in cited document, nor is the document from 2015).

Health

List of countries by life expectancy ranked 84th longest life expectancy in the world.

Human development

List of countries by Human Development Index 2014, ranked 71st highest Human Development in the world

See also
 Outline of Venezuela
 Index of Venezuela-related articles

References

Venezuela